The following is a list of Air Force Falcons men's basketball head coaches. The Falcons have had 8 coaches in their 67-season history.

Air Force's current head coach is Joe Scott. He was hired in March 2020 for his second stint as the Falcons' head coach to replace the fired Dave Pilipovich.

References

Air Force

Air Force Falcons men's basketball coaches